Raphaël Cerf is a French mathematician at Paris-Sud 11 University. For his contributions to probability theory, he won the Rollo Davidson Prize in 1999, and the EMS Prize in 2000. He was an Invited Speaker at the ICM in 2006 in Madrid.

Selected works
 
 The Wulff Crystal in Ising and Percolation models. Springer, Lecture Notes in Mathematics 1878, École d’été de probabilités de Saint-Flour, no. 34, 2004
 On Cramérs Theory in infinite dimensions. Société Mathématique de France, 2007
 Large deviations for three dimensional supercritical percolation. Société Mathématique de France, 2000

References

External links

Website at Paris-Sud 11 University

1969 births
Living people
French mathematicians
Academic staff of the University of Paris